Colobothea delicata is a species of beetle in the family Cerambycidae. It was described by Monné in 2005. It is known from Costa Rica and Panama.

References

delicata
Beetles described in 2005
Beetles of South America